Public viewing may refer to

 Public viewing area in an airport or similar place of interest
 Public screenings of live or recorded events, known in German as "Public Viewing"